Shantanu Thakur (born 1982) is an Indian politician, who has been a Member of Lok Sabha for Bangaon since 2019. He was sworn in as Union Minister of State, Ministry of Ports, Shipping and Waterways after the Cabinet reshuffle on 7 July 2021.

Political career
In the 2019 general election, he became the first non-TMC MP to be elected in this constituency since its delimitation when he was elected on BJP's ticket. He is the son of ex-Bengal Minister Manjul Krishna Thakur. He is a leader of All India Matua Mahasangha.

Minister of State
During the cabinet reshuffle of Second Modi ministry on 7 July 2021, he was given the charge of Minister of State of Ministry of Ports, Shipping and Waterways.

References

India MPs 2019–present
Lok Sabha members from West Bengal
Living people
Bharatiya Janata Party politicians from West Bengal
People from North 24 Parganas district
1982 births
Matua people